Harrison Charles Ashby (born 14 November 2001) is a Scottish professional footballer who plays as a defender for Premier League club Newcastle United.

Club career
Prior to signing for West Ham United at the age of nine, Ashby was on the books at Chelsea. Ashby signed his first professional contract with West Ham in the summer of 2020.

He made his debut on 15 September 2020, replacing Ben Johnson in the 84th minute of the EFL Cup second round fixture versus Charlton Athletic, a match won 3–0 by the Premier League side. On 15 December 2021, Ashby made his Premier League debut as a substitute for Pablo Fornals in a 0–2 away defeat to Arsenal.

On 31 January 2023, Ashby joined Newcastle United for an undisclosed fee. The deal was later reported to be worth £3 million.

International career
Ashby qualifies for Scotland due to Scottish grandparents on his mother's side, and has represented Scotland at under-17 and under-19 levels. On 23 September 2020, Ashby received his first Scotland U21 call-up. He scored his first goal for the U21s on 13 October 2020, rounding off the scoring in a 7–0 win away to San Marino in a Euro U21 qualifier.

Style of play
Ashby's captain at West Ham, Mark Noble, has praised Ashby's "real physical stature" and his technical ability, saying "technically he is also very good, and for him it’s just about getting that experience around us and around the first team. When he’s come in, he has looked really strong. He fully deserved his Premier League debut this year".

Personal life
Ashby is the son of former Watford, Brentford and Gillingham defender Barry Ashby.

Career statistics

References

2001 births
Living people
English footballers
Scottish footballers
Association football defenders
West Ham United F.C. players
Newcastle United F.C. players
Premier League players
Scotland youth international footballers
Scotland under-21 international footballers
English people of Scottish descent